Membe may refer to:

People
 Bernard Membe (born 1953), Tanzanian politician
Fred M'membe (born 1959), Zambian journalist 

Places
 Membe, Tanzania, an administrative ward